Managani festival is a festival celebrated in Karaikal city every year in the Tamil month of Aani. It is celebrated in the memory Lord Bikshantar who will be provided food by Karaikal Ammaiyar, that is Amuthu Padayal in Tamil.

Reason of the celebration
This festival's history relies on Karaikkal Ammaiyar's life. One day Ammaiyar's husband, Paramathathan, had sent two mangoes to be kept for him. That day a hungry Shaiva devotee (Lord Bikshantar) came to her residence. Ammaiyar gave the devotee, curd rice and one of the two mangoes which her husband gave earlier. Later, when Ammaiyar's husband came home, Ammaiyar served him the other mango. The mango was delicious, and her husband requested that the other mango be served. Ammaiyar went inside kitchen, she didn't know what to do since the mango was already served to the shaiva devotee (Lord Bikshantar). With Lord Siva's grace a Divine Mango appeared in her palm. Ammaiyaar was very happy and served the mango to her husband.

As this fruit was divinely sweet and was infinitely delicious compared to the previous one, her husband inquired as to how Ammaiyar obtained this mango. Subsequently, Karaikkal Ammaiyar worshiped Lord's feet and revealed the truth to her husband, who didn't believe it. He asked her to show another mango with divine help. Ammaiyar prayed to Lord Shiva for another mango. Immediately Lord Shiva gave her a similar mango, which she gave it to her husband. The mango then disappeared, and Paramathathan realised the divine nature of his wife. He understood that Ammaiyar was worthy of worship and she cannot be treated as his wife. He then deserted Ammaiyar, becoming a trader and married the daughter of a merchant who then gave birth to their child. Paramathathan named the child with the real name of Ammaiyar, Punithavathi. When the word reached Ammaiyar's family, they decided that they must take her to him. When he saw his former wife, Paramathathan addressed her reverentially, saying that he realised Ammaiyar was no ordinary human being. He worshipped her with his wife and child. Ammaiyar prayed to Lord Shiva asking for a boon that she may worship Lord Shiva as a disembodied wraith. She received the boon, and leaving all her beauty and her body behind. This was the reason of formation of this grand festival of Mangani.

Celebration
The celebration is celebrated in the Tamil month of Aani (June–July)lasting a month. Each day the Panchamurthi or the Five divine Gods idol are taken through each streets of Karaikal. On the main day of the festival the huge idol of Lord Bikshatanar is taken through the streets. On the same day, people of Karaikal throw Mangani or Mangoes from their roof towards the crowd.
Goodness of eating the Mango caught in the festival are:
 The blessings of Lord Shiva is obtained.
 Those who did not get child for long years give birth child.
In the 30 days each day is celebrated with orchestras, debates, bharathanatyam dance etc. The official song of Mangani festival is composed by S.Natarajan, son of Kalaikavalar Karai Subbaiya, one of the most famous musician in Karaikal, owning an orchestra named Newtone Orchestra.

References

Karaikal
Festivals in Karaikal
Tamil festivals